Jain festivals occur on designated days of the year. Jain festivals are either related to life events of Tirthankara or they are performed with intention of purification of soul.

Festivals
There are many religious festivals in Jainism. Some of them are associated with five auspicious life events of Tirthankara known as Panch Kalyanaka. Jains celebrate many annual festivals. Many of the major festivals in Jainism fall in and around the chaomasa (Sanskrit: chaturmasa) period of the calendar. It is the four-month monsoon period when the Jain ascetics are mandated to remain in residence at one place in the Jain tradition, rather than be traveling or going around Indian villages and towns and never staying in one place for more than a month. The comasu period allows the four orders of the Jain community to be together and participate in the festive remembrances.

Paryushana

Paryushana Parva is one of the most important festival for Jains. Paryusana is formed by two words meaning 'a year' and 'a coming back'. This festival comes in the months of Shravana and Bhadra (August or September). Svetambara Jains celebrate it for eight-days while Digambara Jains celebrate it for ten days. It is also known as Das Lakshana Parva. It is a festival of repentance and forgiveness. Many Jains fast and carry out different religious activities. Jain monks stop walking during chaturmas and reside at one place where they lecture on various religious subjects during paryushana. This festival is believed to remove accumulated karma of the previous year and develop control over new accumulating new karma, by following Jain austerities and other rituals. There are regular rituals at the Jain temples. Discourses of Kalpa Sutra are given by monks. Kalpa Sutra describes life of Mahavira and other Tirthankaras. On the third day, procession of Kalpa Sutra is carried out. On the fifth day, auspicious dreams of Trishala, mother of Mahavira are demonstrated and after that birth of Mahavira is celebrated. The tenth day of festival is called Anant Chaturdashi. Anant Chaturdashi is the day when Lord Vasupujya attained moksha (nirvan). Usually, a procession is taken out by Jains on this day. Kshamavani is generally observed a day after Anant Chaturdashi by digambaras, while the shwetambaras observe it after the 8th ie the last day of their paryushan.(last day is called samvatsari)
On Kshamavani, Jains ask for forgiveness from everybody for any acts during the previous year which may have hurt them.

Janma kalayanak

Mahavira was born on the thirteenth day of the bright half of the Jain calendar month of Chaitra, probably 599 BCE. It falls in March or April. This festival marks the birth of lord Mahavira (last, 24th tirtankara). Procession is carried out and lectures on the message of Mahavira are presented. The idols of Mahavira are ceremonially bathed and rocked in a cradle. Events related to birth are also recited from sacred texts by monks.

Ashtahnika Parv

This is a Jain festival celebrated for eight days three times a year in the months of Kartik, Falgun and Ashdah. It is celebrated from eighth day of Shukla Paksh (Waxing moon Cycle) till Purnima/Guru Purnima every year.

Nandishwar Ashtahnika
The Nandishwara island is surrounded by three mountain ranges called the Anjana mountain, the Dadhimukha mountain, and the Ratikara mountain. Since human beings are unable to go to Nandishwar dweep they worship in temples. Jains Perform Special Pooja, SiddhChakra Vidhan, Nandishwar Vidhan and Mandal Vidhan.

The word Ashta meaning eight and Aanika meaning every day. When the festival falls in the months of Aashad and Phalguna, then the ritual is known as Nandishwar Ashtahnika. This ritual helps to gain greater spiritual insight, and wisdom. The observance of this ritual brings wish fulfilment for the devotees.

Diwali

Diwali is one of the most important festival in India. Mahavir attained nirvana followed by moksha on this day in 527 BCE. It falls on the last day of Ashvina month of Jain calendar. It is also the last day of Indian calendar. It comes during October or November. It is believed that the eighteen kings of northern India, followers of Mahavira, decided to light lamps (known as dipa) symbolizing knowledge of Mahavira. So it is known as Deepavali or Diwali. Jains are forbidden to burst crackers. On Diwali morning, Nirvan Ladoo is offered after praying to Lord Mahavira in all Jain temples all across the world. Gautam Gandhar Swami, the chief disciple of Lord Mahavira achieved omniscience (Kevala Gyan) later the same day.

New Year
After celebrating Diwali at the end of Ashwina, Jains celebrate new year on the first day of the following month of Kartika. Ritual of Snatra Puja is performed at the temple. Mahavira's chief disciple Gautama Swami attained keval gyan on this day.

Gyana Panchami
The fifth day of Kartika is known as Gyana Panchami. It is considered knowledge day. On this day holy scriptures are displayed and worshipped.

Pausha Dashmi
It is celebrated on 10th day of dark half of Pausha (Pushya) month of Jain calendar(December/January). It marks Janma Kalyanaka (Birth) of 23rd Tirthankara, Parshvanath. Three days fast known as Attham is observed by many Jains.

Maun agiyaras 
Maun Agiyaras or Ekadashi marks Kalyanaka of many Tirthankaras. It is celebrated on 11th day of Magshar month of Jain calendar(October/November). On this day, complete silence is observed and fasting is kept. Meditation is also performed.

Navapad Oli
The nine-day Oli is a period of semi-fasting. During these period Jains take only one meal a day of food without ghee etc., oils, or any kind of spices. It comes twice a year during March/April and September/October.

Mahamastakabhisheka

Mahamastakabhisheka is a festival held once every twelve years in the town of Shravanabelagola, Karnataka. It is held in veneration of an immense 18 meter high statue of Bahubali. The last anointing took place in February 2018, and the next ceremony will occur in 2030.

Roth Teej
Roth Teej is celebrated on Bhadrapada Shukla Tritiya. On Roth Teej, the Jains are supposed to eat only one type of grain food, roth, once during the day. The festival is a reminder that material wealth is not important, only relinquishment leads to true happiness.

Varshi Tapa or Akshay Tritiya Tapa

Akshaya Tritiya is celebrated to commemorate Lord Adinath's ending of one-year fast by consuming sugarcane juice poured into his cupped hands.
The first Jain Tirthankara Lord Rishabhdev completed of an austerity on 3rd day of the bright fortnight of Vaishakh month of Jain calendar after fasting for 13 months and 13 days continuously. People who performed austerity known as Varshi tapa regarding these event complete the austerity on this day by taking sugar-cane juice.

Shrut Panchami
Shrut Panchami is celebrated by Jains every year in the month of May commemorating Acharya Pushpadanta and Bhutabali.

Posh Dashmi 
Posh Dashmi is the festival to celebrate the life of Parshvanatha.

See also
 God in Jainism
 Kshamavani
 Jain cosmology

References

Citations

Sources
 
 

  

 
Lists of religious festivals